Brandon Saad (born October 27, 1992) is an American professional ice hockey forward currently playing for the St. Louis Blues of the National Hockey League (NHL). Saad was raised in Pittsburgh and attended Pine-Richland High School.

Saad was drafted in the second round, 43rd overall, by the Chicago Blackhawks in the 2011 NHL Entry Draft. He won the Stanley Cup with the Blackhawks in 2013 and 2015. The Blackhawks traded Saad to the Columbus Blue Jackets before the 2015–16 NHL season. He played in Columbus for two seasons before the Blackhawks reacquired him in another trade before the 2017–18 NHL season. Saad was traded to the Colorado Avalanche ahead of the 2020–21 NHL season.

Playing career
As a youth, Saad played in the 2005 Quebec International Pee-Wee Hockey Tournament with the Pittsburgh Hornets minor ice hockey team.

Amateur
In the 2008–09 season Brandon played for the Mahoning Valley Phantoms to start his amateur ice hockey career. In the 2009–10 season, Saad played within the USA Hockey National Team Development Program in the United States Hockey League (USHL), finishing the season with the most goals (12) and points (26) on the team. He would then transfer to the Canadian Hockey League (CHL) for the 2010–11 season to play at the major junior level with the Saginaw Spirit of the Ontario Hockey League (OHL). At the end of the season, Saad was selected by the Chicago Blackhawks in the second round, 43rd overall, of the 2011 NHL Entry Draft.

Professional

Chicago Blackhawks
On October 4, 2011, the Chicago Blackhawks signed Saad to a three-year, entry-level contract. It was announced that he would start the season with the Blackhawks, making him the lowest-selected Chicago draft pick, at 43rd overall, to start with the Blackhawks in their draft year since defenceman Lasse Kukkonen (drafted 151st overall) in the 2003–04 season. Saad later made his NHL debut with the Blackhawks on October 7, 2011, against the Dallas Stars, though he was quickly reassigned to Saginaw five days later, on October 12.

After his return to the Spirit, Saad was named CHL Player of the Week for October 17 to October 23. Following the trade of Saginaw team captain Ryan O'Connor to the Barrie Colts, Saad was named his replacement as captain for the remainder of the 2011–12 season, finishing the year with an OHL-best 1.73 points-per-game average.

Following the conclusion of the OHL season, Saad was recalled to the Blackhawks on April 16, 2012, making his Stanley Cup playoff debut on April 19, 2012. He scored his first NHL point two nights later on April 21 with an assist on a goal by defenceman Nick Leddy against the Phoenix Coyotes, an eventual 2–1 win for Chicago.

On September 15, 2012, Chicago assigned Saad to the Rockford IceHogs of the American Hockey League (AHL) in anticipation of the 2012–13 NHL lockout. He was named CCM/AHL Player of the Week for the period of January 7–13, 2013, after scoring six points in just three games, including two game-winning goals. On January 17, 2013, after the lockout was resolved, the Blackhawks included Saad on the team's starting roster for the shortened, 48-game 2012–13 season. Saad scored his first career NHL goal on February 5 against Antti Niemi of the San Jose Sharks. On February 22, Saad then scored a game-winning, short-handed goal against the Sharks to secure an NHL-record 17th straight game with at least one point to start a season for the 2012–13 Blackhawks, breaking the previous record of 16-straight games held by the 2006–07 Anaheim Ducks. On May 6, Saad was named as a finalist for the 2013 Calder Memorial Trophy as the NHL's top rookie of the year, an award which ultimately went to the Florida Panthers' Jonathan Huberdeau. On June 24, during the 2013 playoffs, Saad and the Blackhawks won the Stanley Cup after defeating the Eastern Conference-winning Boston Bruins in six games in the Finals. Saad would tally six points throughout the Blackhawks' playoff run-a goal and five assists.

During the 2014–15 season, Saad tallied a career-high 23 goals and 29 assists for 52 points. He added eight more goals in the 2015 playoffs, including two game-winners and one short-handed goal, while also recording three assists. On June 15, 2015, Saad won his second Stanley Cup championship with Chicago as the Blackhawks defeated the Tampa Bay Lightning in six games in the Finals. During the 2015 playoffs, Saad scored eight goals and had three assists. He scored the game-winning goal in Game 4 of the Final, assisted by Patrick Kane.

Columbus Blue Jackets
On June 30, 2015, Chicago traded Saad's negotiation rights as a pending restricted free agent, along with prospects Alex Broadhurst and Michael Paliotta, to the Columbus Blue Jackets in exchange for Jeremy Morin, Marko Daňo, Artem Anisimov, Corey Tropp and a fourth-round draft pick in 2016.  On July 3, Saad signed a six-year contract extension with the Blue Jackets worth $36 million.

During the 2015–16 season, Saad was selected to his first All-Star Game. On April 2, 2016, Saad scored his first NHL hat trick in a 5–1 win against the Carolina Hurricanes.

Return to Chicago
On June 23, 2017, Saad returned to the Chicago Blackhawks along with Anton Forsberg and a fifth-round draft pick in 2018 via a trade from the Blue Jackets in exchange for Artemi Panarin, Tyler Motte and a sixth-round draft pick in 2017. Saad began the 2017–18 season in style in his return to the Blackhawks by recording a hat-trick against the Pittsburgh Penguins en route to a 10–1 opening night victory.

Colorado Avalanche
On October 10, 2020, the Blackhawks traded Saad away for a second time in his career, along with Dennis Gilbert, to the Colorado Avalanche in exchange for Nikita Zadorov and Anton Lindholm. As a part of the transaction the Blackhawks retained $1 million of his $6 million salary for the remaining year of his contract.

St. Louis Blues
As a free agent, Saad was signed to a five-year, $22.5 million contract by the Avalanche's divisional rival, the St. Louis Blues, on July 29, 2021.

Family
Saad is the son of a Syrian father, George Sr., and an American mother, Sandy. His father immigrated to America at the age of 18 and also aims to bring his relatives still living in Syria over to America, to avoid the threats of the Syrian civil war.

Career statistics

Regular season and playoffs

International

Awards and honors

References

External links 

 

1992 births
Living people
American men's ice hockey left wingers
American people of Syrian descent
Chicago Blackhawks draft picks
Chicago Blackhawks players
Colorado Avalanche players
Ice hockey people from Pittsburgh
Middle Eastern Christians
National Hockey League All-Stars
Pine-Richland High School alumni
Rockford IceHogs (AHL) players
Saginaw Spirit players
St. Louis Blues players
Stanley Cup champions
USA Hockey National Team Development Program players